Master of Bankdam (called The Master of Bankdam in its own credits) is a 1947 British historical film directed by Walter Forde and based on the 1940 novel The Crowthers of Bankdam  by Thomas Armstrong. It stars Anne Crawford, Dennis Price, Tom Walls, Stephen Murray, Linden Travers and David Tomlinson. The story concerns two generations of brothers who struggle for control of the family business in 19th century Yorkshire.

Plot 

The film begins in the 1850s at the time of the Crimean War. Bankdam is a small Yorkshire mill run by the Crowther family. It prospers and grows under its patriarch owner, Simeon Crowther. After family upheavals the firm goes through several crises under the management of his sons Zebediah and Joshua, who tend to oppose one another. Joshua dies with many others in a mill collapse, partially blamed on his brother Zebediah. Joshua's role is taken over by his son Simeon (junior). Later, the old patriarch, Simeon (senior), dies.

Zebediah is diagnosed with a rare heart condition and retires to Vienna for specialist treatment, leaving his son, Lancelot Handel, with power of attorney in his absence. Things at the mill deteriorate due to the new American McKinley Tariff and mismanagement. Lancelot reacts by firing men indiscriminately. Anger grows in the community. In the final scene a fatally ill Zebediah returns and, with a mob outside the door, chastises Lancelot for squandering money and ruining the family firm. Zebediah talks down an angry mob outside. Simeon Junior then promises to reopen the mills. Zebediah hears Simeon's speech to the crowd and decides Simeon must be the new Master of Bankdam and entrusts Bankdam.

Cast 

Anne Crawford as Annie Pickersgill
Dennis Price as Joshua Crowther
Tom Walls as Simeon Crowther Senior
Stephen Murray as Zebediah Crowther
Linden Travers as Clara Baker
Jimmy Hanley as Simeon Crowther Junior
Nancy Price as Lydia Crowther
David Tomlinson as Lancelot Handel Crowther
Patrick Holt as Lemuel Pickersgill
Herbert Lomas as Tom France
Frederick Piper as Ben Pickersgill
Beatrice Varley as Mrs Pickersgill
Raymond Rollett as Handel Baker
April Stride as Sophie Teresa Crowther
Avis Scott as Mary Crowther
Nicholas Parsons as Edgar Hoylehouse
Maria Var as The Singer
Shelagh Fraser as Alice France
Edgar K. Bruce as Ezra Hoylehouse
Frank Henderson as Doctor Clough
Aubrey Mallalieu as Doctor Bouviere
Kenneth Buckley as Brough
Lyn Evans as Shires
Bertram Shuttleworth as Shires
Amy Veness as Mrs Pilling

Production 

The film was produced by Walter Forde and Edward Dryhurst, and directed by Walter Forde. It was adapted for the screen by Edward Dryhurst with additional dialogue by Moie Charles. The music was by Arthur Benjamin, performed by London Philharmonic and conducted by Muir Mathieson. There is also evidence that it was produced by Ernest G. Roy of Nettlefold Studios, according to his death notices.

The film was made by Holbein Films at Nettlefold Studios, Walton-on-Thames, Surrey, England. It was produced by Rank Films and distributed by Prestige Films.

References

External links
 
 Hal Erickson's review at allmovie.com 
 Review at britishpictures.com
 Review of film at Variety

1947 films
Films based on British novels
Films set in the 1850s
Films set in the 1860s
Films set in the 1870s
Films set in the 1880s
Films set in the 1890s
Films set in England
British historical films
1940s historical films
Films with screenplays by Edward Dryhurst
British black-and-white films
Films shot at Nettlefold Studios
Films produced by Ernest G. Roy
Films directed by Walter Forde
1940s English-language films
1940s British films